Oosterella is an extinct ammonoid cephalopod genus belonging to the family Oosterellidae. These fast-moving nektonic carnivores  lived during the Cretaceous, from the upper Valanginian age to the lower Hauterivian age.

Species

Oosterella colombiana Haas, 1960
Oosterella cultratus d'Orbigny, 1841
Oosterella ondulata Reboulet, 1996
Oosterella vilanovae Nicklas, 1892

Distribution
Fossils of species within this genus have been found in the Cretaceous sediments of Argentina, Austria, Colombia, Czech Republic, France, Hungary, Italy, Mexico, Morocco, Romania and Slovakia.

References

Cretaceous ammonites
Ammonites of Europe
Ammonitida genera
Perisphinctoidea